Bald Rock may refer to:

United States
Bald Rock, California
Bald Rock, Butte County, California
 Bald Rock in Flathead County, Montana
 Bald Rock Heritage Preserve, South Carolina

Elsewhere
Bald Rock, Nova Scotia, Canada
Bald Rock National Park, New South Wales, Australia
 Pukepohatu / Bald Rock, Northland, New Zealand